Sherbournia is a genus of flowering plants in the family Rubiaceae. It comprises 13 currently recognized species. It was named after British botanist Margaret Sherbourne. (1791-1846)

References

External links
 Sherbournia in the World Checklist of Rubiaceae

Rubiaceae genera
Sherbournieae